The 1999 Colchester Borough Council election took place on 6 May 1999 to elect members of Colchester Borough Council in Essex, England. One third of the council was up for election and the council stayed under no overall control.

After the election, the composition of the council was:
Liberal Democrats 26
Conservative 18
Labour 15
Independent 1

Election result

Ward results

Berechurch

Boxted & Langham

Castle

Great & Little Horksley

Great Tey

Harbour

Lexden

Mile End

New Town

Prettygate

Shrub End

St. Andrew's

St. Anne's

St. John's

St. Mary's

Stanway

Tiptree

West Bergholt & Eight Ash Green

West Mersea

Wivenhoe

References

1999 English local elections
1999
1990s in Essex